The following is a list of events affecting Tamil language television in 2018 from (India, Sri Lanka, Singapore and Tamil diaspora). Events listed include television show debuts, and finales; channel launches, and closures; stations changing or adding their network affiliations; and information about changes of ownership of channels or stations.

Event

January/தை

February/மாசி

Special Premiere Movies

January

Television program

Returning this year

Milestone episodes

Ending this year

Deaths

References

External links 
 Official Website 

2018 in Tamil-language television